Aerovías Nacionales Quisqueyana, also known as Quisqueyana, was an airline from the Dominican Republic which was based at Las Américas International Airport, Santo Domingo, during the 1960s and 1970s. Offering mostly flights to the United States and to Europe, Quisqueyana was in direct competition with Dominicana, which at the time was the flag carrier of the country.

History
Quisqueyana was founded in 1962, aiming at the Dominican VFR traffic within the Americas and to Europe. It became the second largest airline of the Dominican Republic, but ultimately lost the competition with Dominicana. In 1978, the airline suspended all flights and was shut down, though technically its airline license stayed valid until 1993.

Destinations
In 1976, Quisqueyana offered scheduled flights to the following destinations:

 Santo Domingo - Las Américas International Airport hub

 Rome - Leonardo da Vinci-Fiumicino Airport

 San Juan - Luis Muñoz Marín International Airport

Madrid - Barajas International Airport

 Miami - Miami International Airport

Fleet
Over the years of its existence, Quisqueyana operated the following aircraft types:
Boeing 707
Boeing 727
Convair 880
Curtiss-Wright C-46 Commando
Douglas DC-3
Douglas DC-8
Lockheed Constellation (last airline in the world to use this type for passenger flights)
Martin 4-0-4

Incidents
On 26 January 1971, a hijacking attempt occurred on board a Quisqueyana Lockheed Constellation. A person demanded to be taken to Cuba, but was quickly overpowered by passengers.
On 31 August 1979, a Quisqueyana Constellation (registered HI-260) was destroyed during Hurricane David. The abandoned aircraft had been parked at Las Américas International Airport, Santo Domingo following the demise of the airline.

References

Defunct airlines of the Dominican Republic
Airlines established in 1962
Airlines disestablished in 1978
1962 establishments in the Dominican Republic
1978 disestablishments in the Dominican Republic